The 2006 IIHF European Women's Champions Cup was the third holding of the IIHF European Women's Champions Cup. AIK IF Solna of Sweden's  Riksserien won the tournament for the third consecutive time.

An additional group was introduced in the Qualification of this tournament, adding four teams and bringing the total number of participating teams to seventeen from sixteen countries.  As the defending cup holders, AIK IF progressed directly to the Super Final and did not participate in the Qualification.

Like the other IIHF tournaments in the 2006–07 season, games in this year's tournament could no longer end in a tie. If no winner was determined after overtime, the game would progress to a shootout. The change necessitated a reassessment of points awarded for match outcomes: three points were awarded for a regulation win, two points for an overtime/shootout win, one point for a regulation loss, and no points/zero points for an overtime/shootout loss.

Each of the Qualification groups and the Super Final were played as single round-robin tournaments.

Qualification

Group A

Group B

Group C

Group D

Super Final

References 
Content in this article is translated from the existing German Wikipedia article at :de:IIHF European Women Champions Cup 2006; see its history for attribution.

Tournament statistics and data from:

 Coupe d'Europe féminine des clubs champions 2006/07. hockeyarchives.info (in French). Retrieved 26 March 2020.
 EWCC (W) - 2006-2007 Standings. eliteprospects.com. Retrieved 2020-03-26.

Women
2006
Euro